The Good Shepherd is a 2006 American spy film produced and directed by Robert De Niro and starring Matt Damon, Angelina Jolie, and De Niro, with an extensive supporting cast. Although it is a fictional film loosely based on real events of James Jesus Angleton, it is advertised as telling the untold story of the birth of counterintelligence in the Central Intelligence Agency (CIA).

The film was released on December 22, 2006, to mixed reviews. It grossed $100 million against an estimated $80 million production budget.

Plot
In 1961, senior CIA officer Edward Wilson receives a photograph and tape recording after the failed Bay of Pigs Invasion, and obtains a coded signal from "Cardinal.” Then the film flashes back to 1939.

Attending Yale University, Edward is invited to join Skull and Bones. During his initiation, he reveals that he discovered but never read the suicide note left by his father, Thomas Wilson, an admiral who was to be named Secretary of the Navy until his loyalties were questioned. 
FBI agent Sam Murach recruits Edward to expose professor Dr. Fredericks as a Nazi spy, which leads to Fredericks' resignation. 
Edward dates a fellow Yale student he meets in the library named Laura, who is hearing impaired. As he's starting to fall for Laura, he meets Margaret “Clover” Russell, at a party in 1940.
Clover, who is the sister of a fellow Skull and Bones brother, as well as the daughter of the Head of the Anti-Interventionist Committee America First Committee. 
General Bill Sullivan then offers Edward a post in London, which would later become one of the first branches of the OSS.

Clover's brother John tells Edward that she is pregnant with Edward's child. 
Laura, reading their lips, leaves. 
Edward then marries Clover and accepts General Bill Sullivan’s offer. The offer which has him leaving his new wife Clover at home while he heads to London. 
There he finds Dr. Fredericks is actually a British intelligence operative who had recommended Edward for counter-espionage training.
Special Operations Executive officer Arch Cummings informs Edward that Fredericks' indiscreet liaisons pose a security risk. 
Fredericks refuses to retire quietly and is killed.

In post-war Berlin, Edward collaborates with Soviet counterpart "Ulysses". Learning his wife Clover is having an affair, Edward then sleeps with his interpreter Hanna Schiller.
He then realizes she is a Soviet operative and Hanna  is killed. 
After six years, Edward returns home to a distant Clover (who is now going by  her first name, Margaret). Edward helps General Bill Sullivan form the CIA with their colleague, Richard Hayes under advisement of Phillip Allen.

While monitoring Soviet activity in Central America, Edward receives an agent’s severed finger, after the CIA unleashed locusts on a Soviet fronted coffee company. He recognizes "Ulysses" who sent him the finger initially. 
Valentin Mironov convinces Edward he is a high-ranking KGB defector. Edward encounters Laura, and rekindles their forgotten romance. 
But, then Margaret confronts him with compromising photographs, which causes Edward to end the affair. 
Another Soviet defector claims he is the real Mironov, and that the other person is an imposter and a double-agent. Tortured and administered liquid LSD, the Soviet defector ridicules his interrogators before hurling himself out of a window. 
The first defector, who had first claimed to be Mironov,  watches this unfold with Edward. He then offers to take LSD to prove his innocence, but Edward declines.

At Yale, his son Edward Jr.  joins Skull and Bones as his father had. He is then approached by the CIA shortly after. 
Despite Margaret’s pleas, Edward Jr. decides to join the agency. 
Edward Jr. overhears his father and colleague Richard Hayes, discuss the upcoming Bay of Pigs invasion. Edward realizes his son has heard about the covert operation and  warns him of the extreme importance to remain silent.
 
Margaret leaves Edward and moves out.

In 1961, the tape recording, which had been delivered with a photograph to Edward earlier, leads CIA specialists to deduce the photograph may have been taken in Léopoldville. 

Edward looks and realizes the photograph is of his son, Edward Jr. and the tape is a recording of his voice.

He meets "Ulysses", who then plays the un-edited audio tape where Edward Jr. is clearly heard discussing the conversation between his father and his colleague, Hayes, that he overheard regarding the "Bay of Pigs" Operation.
Unknown to Edward Jr., Miriam is a Soviet spy who receives this information from him and reports it. Compromising the entire operation which highly depended on being covert.

The Soviets, in exchange for his son’s protection, require Edward to spy for the Soviet Union and betray his country. 
Edward confronts his son about what he has done. Edward Jr. refuses to believe that Miriam is a Soviet spy.

Edward then exposes Valentin Mironov as a double-agent and Officer Arch Cummings as a co-conspirator. Cummings flees to Moscow. 
Ulysses’ aide is then revealed to be “Cardinal”, Edward's mole and the informant of Edward Jr's conversation. 
Edward and Margaret arrive separately in the Congo for Edward Jr.'s wedding to Miriam. While in transit to the ceremony via aircraft, Miriam is thrown out of the plane. 
Edward informs his son of Miriam's death and denies all responsibility. But Edward is shaken to learn Miriam was pregnant.

Edward meets Hayes at the new CIA headquarters, noting the lobby’s Biblical inscription: "And ye shall know the truth, and the truth shall make you free (John 8:32)." 
Philip Allen is resigning in disgrace, and the President has named Hayes the new Director of the CIA. Hayes appoints Edward to be the First Head of counter-intelligence.

Edward decides to finally read his father’s suicide note.
Edward learns from the note  that his father had indeed  betrayed his country. He then urged his son to live a life of decency and truth.

Edward burns the note, and leaves the office from his past, and heads to a new office in a wing of the CIA.

Cast

 Matt Damon as Edward Wilson Sr. He is the film's main character, partly based on James Jesus Angleton and partly on covert operations specialist Richard Bissell his false identity in Britain was "Mr. Carlson"
 Angelina Jolie as Margaret "Clover" Russell Wilson, who shares a name with Allen Dulles' wife 
 Robert De Niro as General Bill Sullivan, based on William J. Donovan
 Alec Baldwin as FBI Agent Sam Murach
 William Hurt as CIA Director Philip Allen, likely based on Allen Dulles
 Joe Pesci as Joseph Palmi, based partly on Sam Giancana and Santo Trafficante Jr. The Good Shepherd marked Joe Pesci's return to acting after an eight-year absence from the screen following Lethal Weapon 4. 
 John Turturro as Ray Brocco, based on Angleton deputy Raymond Rocca
 Billy Crudup as Archibald "Arch" Cummings, based on Kim Philby, and named for E.E. Cummings, a real life confidant of Angleton.
 Tammy Blanchard as Laura
 Michael Gambon as Dr. Fredericks
 Timothy Hutton as Admiral Thomas Wilson, based on James Forrestal.
 John Sessions as Valentin Mironov #1 / Yuri Modin, based on Anatoliy Golitsyn, and on Yuri Modin, the 'legman' KGB operative controlling the 'Cambridge Five'.
 Keir Dullea as Senator John Russell Sr.
 Martina Gedeck as Hanna Schiller
 Gabriel Macht as John Russell Jr.
 Lee Pace as Deputy Director Richard Hayes, based on Richard Helms
 Eddie Redmayne as Older Edward Wilson Jr.
 Tommy Nelson as Edward Jr. - Age 6-7 
 Mark Ivanir as Valentin Mironov #2, based on Yuri Nosenko
 Oleg Stefan as Stas Siyanko / Ulysses
 Liya Kebede as Miriam

Production
Robert De Niro directed the film, and produced it in conjunction with James G. Robinson and Jane Rosenthal. Academy Award Winning screenwriter, Eric Roth, began work on the movie after abandoning his attempt to adapt Norman Mailer's Harlot's Ghost for the big screen. Just like De Niro's project, Mailer's novel, Harlot's Ghost, is a fictionalized chronicle of the CIA.

Eric Roth originally wrote the screenplay in 1994 for Francis Ford Coppola, and Columbia Pictures. After reading Norman Mailer's Harlot's Ghost, Roth became intrigued by the inner-workings of the people who created the CIA. Coppola ultimately departed from the project, citing his inability to relate to the main characters due to their lack of emotion, but is credited as Co-Executive Producer. Following Coppola's departure, Wayne Wang was tapped to Direct, and was in the midst of Pre-Production location scouting when personnel changes in Columbia's production department ended his involvement. Columbia's new production team opted to give Roth a list of Directors to choose from; one of them being Philip Kaufman. Kaufman and Roth worked together on the project for a year overhauling the story's narrative structure that was originally linear (chronological order), adapting it to its final non-linear structure, going backward and forward in time. Kaufman, who believed this change would "give it a more contemporary feeling," helped give this complex story a more cohesive narrative context, and provided subtext for characters' motivations. However, neither this partnership nor the project would survive another dramatic shake-up at the studio, when the new studio head halted production due to his lack of interest in making a spy film that fell outside the action genre.

The project languished until John Frankenheimer signed on to make the film with MGM agreeing to purchase the rights. He wanted Robert De Niro to star, having just worked together on Ronin. De Niro had been developing his own spy story about the CIA from the Bay of Pigs Invasion to the fall of the Berlin Wall in 1989 and agreed to appear in the film. During pre-production in 2002, Frankenheimer died. According to producer Jane Rosenthal, this had been Robert De Niro's pet project for nine years, but it proved difficult to produce in a pre-9/11 world and had to compete with his busy schedule as an actor. The actor said in an interview, "I had always been interested in the Cold War. I was raised in the Cold War. All of the intelligence stuff was interesting to me". De Niro and Roth ended up making a deal: Roth would turn De Niro's idea into a screenplay if the actor would direct Roth's existing script. If The Good Shepherd proved to be a commercial success then their follow-up would be De Niro's pitch.

De Niro took the project to Universal Pictures where Producer, Graham King, agreed to help finance the $110 million budget. Initially they had a deal with Leonardo DiCaprio, who was interested in playing the film's protagonist, Edward Wilson. De Niro planned to being production in early 2005, but DiCaprio had to back out due to his scheduling conflict filming The Departed for Martin Scorsese. At this point, King left the project, as did his backers. De Niro approached Matt Damon, who was also doing The Departed but would be done earlier than DiCaprio and De Niro would only have to wait six months to do the film with him. Initially, Damon had to turn down De Niro's offer because he was scheduled to shoot Steven Soderbergh's The Informant!, but was able to sign on to star as Edward Wilson after Soderbergh agreed to delay filming. James Robinson's Morgan Creek Productions agreed to help finance the film with a budget under $90 million, which meant that many of the principal actors, Damon included, would have to waive their usual salaries to keep costs down.

De Niro was not interested in making a spy movie featuring excessive amounts of violence and exciting car chases. "I just like it when things happen for a reason. So I want to downplay the violence, depict it in a muted way. In those days, it was a gentleman's game". He and Roth were also interested in showing how absolute power corrupted the leaders of the CIA. Early on during production, De Niro said in an interview, "they tried to do what they thought was right. And then, as they went on, they became overconfident and started doing things that are not always in our best interests". In preparation for the film, De Niro watched spy films like The Spy Who Came In From the Cold, The Third Man, and the Smiley's People miniseries.

He also hired retired CIA officer Milton Bearden to serve as a technical adviser on the film. They had first worked together on Meet the Parents where De Niro played a retired CIA officer. Bearden agreed to take De Niro through Afghanistan to the north-west frontier of Pakistan and into Moscow for a guided tour of intelligence gathering. Damon also spent time with Bearden as well as visiting several of the locations depicted in the film and reading several books on the CIA. Bearden also made sure that the historical aspects were correct but fictionalized to a certain degree.

Principal photography began on August 18, 2005, with shooting taking place in New York City, Washington D.C., London, and the Dominican Republic. Three-time Academy Award-nominated art director Jeannine Oppewall was assigned art director for The Good Shepherd, which would eventually earn Oppewall her fourth Oscar nomination for Best Art Design. She conducted a large amount of research for the film that filled ten to twelve  three-ring binders. It took her a week to organize the number of set locations due to the large amounts of settings in the script, which included Cuba, Léopoldville, London, Guatemala, Moscow, New York City and New Haven, Connecticut, among other places.

Although the vast majority of the movie was filmed in New York, the only scenes that are actually set in New York were filmed at the Kirby Hill Estate on Long Island. As a result, many sets had to be constructed under Oppewall's direction, including a Skull and Bones headquarters and the Berlin set, which was built on the Brooklyn Navy Yard. The interiors of the CIA were built in the Brooklyn Armory, a large edifice built in 1901 for the United States Cavalry. She also visited the CIA's headquarters in Washington, D.C. and worked with Bearden to create sets for the CIA's offices, Technical Room and Communications Room.

Since the lead character originally aspired to be a poet, Oppewall incorporated many visual poetic symbols into the film, including a large number of mirrors to represent the duplicity of the CIA, full-rigged ships as symbols of the state, and eagle symbols, which were used in ironic situations such as suspect interrogations. Her team tracked down the right set dressings and also found authentic Teletype machines, reel-to-reel tape recorders and radios used in the CIA during that time.

Music
The music for the film was by  Bruce Fowler and Marcelo Zarvos. They replaced James Horner, who left the project due to creative differences.

The violin solo is an extract from Tchaikovsky's Violin Concerto In D though this is misattributed to Marcelo Zarvos on the soundtrack CD.

Release and reception

Box office
The Good Shepherd was released on December 22, 2006 in 2,215 theaters, grossing $9.9 million on its opening weekend. Ultimately it grossed $100,266,865 worldwide.

Critical response
On review aggregation website Rotten Tomatoes, the film holds an approval rating of 55% based on 171 reviews, with an average rating of 6.14/10. The site's critics consensus states: "Though ambitious and confidently directed by Robert De Niro, The Good Shepherd is ultimately a tedious drama that holds few surprises and succumbs to self-seriousness." At Metacritic the film has a weighted average score of 61 out of 100, based on 33 critics, indicating "generally favorable reviews".  Audiences polled by CinemaScore gave the film an average grade of "B−" on an A+ to F scale.

In her review for The New York Times, Manohla Dargis wrote, "The Good Shepherd is an original story about the C.I.A., and for the filmmakers that story boils down to fathers who fail their sons, a suspect metaphor that here becomes all too ploddingly literal", but praised De Niro's direction: "Among the film's most striking visual tropes is the image of Wilson simply going to work in the capital alongside other similarly dressed men, a spectral army clutching briefcases and silently marching to uncertain victory". Kenneth Turan, in his review for the Los Angeles Times, praised Matt Damon's performance: "Damon, in his second major role of the year (after The Departed) once again demonstrates his ability to convey emotional reserves, to animate a character from the inside out and create a man we can sense has more of an interior life than he is willing to let on".

Time magazine's Richard Corliss also gave Damon a positive notice in his review: "Damon is terrific in the role-all-knowing, never overtly expressing a feeling. Indeed, so is everyone else in this intricate, understated but ultimately devastating account of how secrets, when they are left to fester, can become an illness, dangerous to those who keep them, more so to nations that base their policies on them". In  his review for The New York Observer, Andrew Sarris wrote, "Still, no previous American film has ventured into this still largely unknown territory with such authority and emotional detachment. For this reason alone, The Good Shepherd is must-see viewing". USA Today gave the film three out of four stars and wrote, "What makes the story work so powerfully is his focus on a multidimensional individual—Wilson—thereby creating a stirring personal tale about the inner workings of the clandestine government agency". Entertainment Weekly gave the film a "B" rating and Lisa Schwarzbaum praised De Niro's direction and Damon's performance, noting the latter's maturation as an actor.

Newsweek magazine's David Ansen wrote, "For the film's mesmerizing first 50 minutes I thought De Niro might pull off the Godfather of spy movies ... Still, even if the movie's vast reach exceeds its grasp, it's a spellbinding history lesson". However, Peter Travers of Rolling Stone magazine observed that, "It's tough to slog through a movie that has no pulse". In his review for the Chicago Sun-Times, Jim Emerson wrote, "If you think George Tenet's Central Intelligence Agency was a disaster, wait until you see Robert De Niro's torpid, ineffectual movie about the history of the agency". Peter Bradshaw in The Guardian gave the film two out of five stars and criticized Damon's performance: "And why is Damon allowed to act in such a callow, boring way? As ever, he looks like he is playing Robin to some imaginary Batman at his side, like Jimmy Stewart and his invisible rabbit. His nasal, unobtrusive voice makes every line sound the same".

Historical accuracy debate
Members of the CIA's History Staff criticized the historical atmosphere depicted by the film. In May, 2007, the Center for the Study of Intelligence (Center for the Study of Intelligence), a history group of the CIA, held a round-table with a number of on-staff historians to discuss the film. The discussion was publicly released as an article; it covered the film's depiction of the OSS and CIA, the accuracy of the film's depiction of both the events and atmosphere of the period, and discussed factual details surrounding the actual persons on whom some of the film's characters were based. According to the article, the film was meticulous in getting small details (especially artifacts) correct, but the overall depiction of the atmosphere and motivations of the time was flawed. Nicholas Dujmovic said:A film can take a strictly documentary approach ... If that's the standard, then anyone with historical sense is going to dislike the liberties The Good Shepherd takes. If one approaches the film as a work of art, one must still ask if there is truth in the story-telling. Does it convey the sense of the time: the atmosphere, the motivations, the tone, and the challenges? I think we all agree that the film fails that test as well. It fails because it inserts themes we know from our studies of the period were not there: the overarching economic interest, the WASP mafia dominance, the cynicism, the dark perspective. In reality, the stakes were high during the Cold War; the Soviets were seen to be on the march and very dangerous. It was serious business, and there were many personal costs. And yet, most CIA people were enjoying their work at the same time, as any number of oral history interviews and memoirs will attest.
The same article also describes the depiction of Yale's infamous secret society, Skull and Bones, as being an incubator of the U.S. Intelligence Community as "inaccurate."

The film depicts the Bay of Pigs Invasion failure as the result of a leak within the CIA. James K. Galbraith wrote that the Taylor Report on the invasion confirmed the existence of a leak:One of the great travesties of the Cold War surfaced on April 29, 2000 when the Washington Post reported the declassification in full of General Maxwell Taylor's June, 1961 special report on the Bay of Pigs invasion. Partial versions of this document have been available for decades. But only now did its darkest secret spill. Here is what Taylor reported to Kennedy. The Russians knew the date of the invasion (Therefore, Castro also knew.) The CIA, headed by Allen Dulles, knew that the Russians knew (Therefore, they knew the invasion would fail). The leak did not come from the invasion force; it had happened before the Cuban exiles were themselves briefed on the date. Kennedy was not informed. Nor, of course, were the exiles. And knowing all this, Dulles ordered the operation forward.

One of the panel of CIA historians who discussed the movie in a round table strongly disagreed that the leak was crucial, saying:Even if the operation had initially succeeded, the idea that this paramilitary battalion would have melted into the jungles and mountains to spawn a general uprising against Castro is fatuous. CIA's own analysts judged that Castro's popular support was strong and that he controlled the army and the security services. Even if the group had secured the beachhead, its members eventually would have been hunted down. The supposed leak had nothing to do with historical reality.

Accolades
In 2007, the cast of The Good Shepherd won the Silver Bear of the Berlin International Film Festival for outstanding artistic contribution. It was the only American entry in 2007 to win a prize at the festival.

It was also nominated at the 79th Academy Awards in the category of Best Art Direction (Jeannine Oppewall, Gretchen Rau and Leslie E. Rollins).

Possible sequel
De Niro said he would like to make two sequels to The Good Shepherd, one bringing the action forward from 1961 to 1989 and the fall of the Berlin Wall, the other following its protagonist, Edward Wilson, up to the present day.

In September 2012, it was announced that Showtime is developing the sequel as a television series, with Roth as executive producer and writer and De Niro directing the pilot. As of July 2021, it has not come to fruition. In an October 2020 interview De Niro stated that he worked with Eric Roth on a sequel, but that it 'never happened'. However, if someone gave him the money to make a sequel, he would.

See also
List of films featuring the deaf and hard of hearing

References

Bibliography

External links
 
 
 
 
 
 

2006 films
2006 drama films
2000s spy drama films
American political drama films
American Zoetrope films
Cold War spy films
Films about the Central Intelligence Agency
Films about secret societies
Films about security and surveillance
Films directed by Robert De Niro
Films produced by Robert De Niro
Films scored by Marcelo Zarvos
Films set in the 1930s
Films set in 1939
Films set in the 1940s
Films set in the 1950s
Films set in the 1960s
Films set in 1961
Films set in Berlin
Films set in Connecticut
Films set in London
Films set in Washington, D.C.
Films shot in the Dominican Republic
Films shot in London
Films shot in New York City
Films shot in Washington, D.C.
Morgan Creek Productions films
American nonlinear narrative films
Films with screenplays by Eric Roth
Films set in the Democratic Republic of the Congo
Silver Bear for outstanding artistic contribution
Films set in Langley, Virginia
Universal Pictures films
2000s English-language films
2000s American films